The Dominican Republic requires its residents to register their motor vehicles and display vehicle registration plates. Current plates are North American standard 6 × 12 inches (152 × 300 mm). The background and the first letter of the plate varies depending on the type of the plate.

Passenger baseplates
The Dominican Republic issued a single plate to each vehicle twice a year. The 1st (1º) period of each year was 1 January to 30 June, and the 2nd (2º) period was 1 July to 31 December. The period number is shown on each plate, and the tables below shown these as either "1st" or "2nd" to differentiate the two plates. The colors of the two periods in each year were also different so it was easy to spot who had not paid the latest registration cost.

1930 - 1939

1940 - 1949

1950 - 1959

1960 - 1969

1970 - 1979

1980 - 1989

Modern plates

Other plate types

References

External links

Dominican Republic
Transport in the Dominican Republic
Dominican Republic transport-related lists